The 2010 Arizona State Sun Devils football team represented Arizona State University in the 2010 NCAA Division I FBS football season. The Sun Devils were led by head coach Dennis Erickson in his 4th season. They played their home games at Sun Devil Stadium and are members of the Pacific-10 Conference. They finished the season 6–6, 4–5 in Pac-10 play. Despite a .500 record, the Sun Devils were not bowl eligible due to two wins over teams from the FCS.

Schedule

Game summaries

Northern Arizona

Portland State

Wisconsin

Oregon

On September 25, 2010, Oregon defeated Arizona State in Tempe, Arizona by a score of 42-31. Though a night game, kickoff temperatures for the game soared at 100 degrees Fahrenheit. Arizona State took an early lead in the game, but Oregon responded with a season-high 4 team interceptions. The Sun Devils held primary running back LaMichael James to only 114 rushing yards, but the total was enough to move James past the 2,000 yard mark for his career. Oregon quarterback Darren Thomas had 290 passing yards in the game, including a 61-yard pass to tight end David Paulson, which were career longs for both players. The win was sufficiently impressive to Associated Press voters to move the Ducks from 5th to 4th (past TCU) in the September 27th AP Poll.

Oregon State

Washington

California

California faced Arizona State, who was coming off a bye week and looking for their first win in Berkeley since 1997. Although Sun Devils quarterback Steven Threet completed passes of 44 and 26 yards on the opening possession, Arizona State had to settle for a field goal, after which Cal took control of the game. The Bears responded with a drive that also resulted in a field goal, then intercepted Threet deep in Cal territory, but couldn't capitalize on the turnover. After forcing a three and out, Cal took advantage of a 28-yard punt return by wide receiver Jeremy Ross that gave them great field possession on the Arizona State 28-yard line. The Bears took advantage of two Sun Devils penalties with Shane Vereen scoring the game's first touchdown on an 8-yard run. Cal scored again to open the second quarter on a 4-yard pass from Kevin Riley to wide receiver Keenan Allen, with the PAT being blocked. Riley then connected with wide receiver Marvin Jones for a 52-yard score. A 37-yard field goal attempt by Arizona State missed, while Cal made one from 23 yards to put the Bears up 26 to 3 at the half.

Backup quarterback Samson Szakacsy stepped in for Threet, who had been injured. The Bears scored to open the second half on a 5-yard run by Vereen. Two minutes later, the Bears blocked a Sun Devils punt, which was recovered by defensive back Chris Conte for a 7-yard score. Arizona State in turn was able to block a Cal punt for a 1-yard touchdown by linebacker Oliver Aron. Cal opened the fourth quarter with a field goal, then scored on a 19-yard run by wide receiver Jeremy Ross. The final score of the game came on a fumble by backup quarterback Brock Mansion which was recovered by linebacker Brandon Magee for a 26-yard score.

Kevin Riley threw for 240 yards and two scores, while Shane Vereen rushed for 91 yards, tying him for fifth place in career rushing touchdowns with Justin Forsett, while wide receiver Marvin Jones had 110 receiving yards and a score. Steven Threet threw for 130 yards with two interceptions and Szakacsy able to only manage 66. The Sun Devils were held to 51 rushing yards.

Washington State

USC

Stanford

UCLA

Arizona State quarterback Brock Osweiler threw 4 touchdown passes while UCLA quarterback Richard Brehaut had three. The victory ended UCLA's hope of a bowl game in December.

Arizona

References

Arizona State
Arizona State Sun Devils football seasons
Arizona State Sun Devils football